Live is the fourth studio album released by the Japanese boy group NEWS. The album is certified gold for a shipment of 100,000 copies and even top the Oricon chart.

Album information
Despite its members expanding to solo projects and other musical units in the past year, popular Johnny's pop group NEWS continues going strong as a unit as well. After a long 22 months' wait, they finally unleash their latest full-length album. Live is NEWS' fourth album, and it features their hit singles "Koi no ABO" and "Sakura Girl". The album will also mark the first release of "Be Funky", the theme song to the TV drama Troubleman, starring member Kato Shigeaki. In addition to the group's usual musical collaborator zopp, GreeeeN's usual producer Jin also joins the fun with the album's title track Live.

First Press Edition comes with the group's Unplugged live concert and its making of on a bonus DVD.

Track listing

Charts and certifications

Charts

Sales and certifications

Release history

References

External links
Official website 

2010 albums
News (band) albums